Dorothy Leigh Sayers (usually stylised as Dorothy L. Sayers; 1893–1957) was an English crime writer, poet, playwright, essayist, translator and Christian humanist; she was also a student of classical and modern languages. She is perhaps best known for her mysteries, a series of novels and short stories, set between the First and Second World Wars, which feature  Lord Peter Wimsey, an English aristocrat and amateur sleuth. Sayers herself considered her translation of Dante's Divine Comedy to be her best work.

Sayers was educated at home and then at the University of Oxford. This was unusual for a woman at the time, as women were not admitted as full members of the university until 1920five years after Sayers had completed her first-class degree in medieval French. In 1916, a year after her graduation, Sayers published her first book, a collection of poems entitled Op. I, which she followed two years later with a second, a slim volume titled Catholic Tales and Christian Songs. The same year she was invited to edit and contribute to the annual editions of Oxford Poetry, which she did for the next three years. In 1923 she published Whose Body?, a murder mystery novel featuring the fictional Lord Peter Wimsey, and went on to write eleven novels and 21 short stories about the character. The Wimsey stories were popular, and successful enough for Sayers to leave the advertising agency where she was working. She also wrote 11 Montague Egg stories and several non-series stories.

Towards the end of the 1930s, and without explanation, Sayers stopped writing crime stories and turned instead to religious plays and essays, and to translations. Some of her plays were broadcast on the BBC, others performed at the Canterbury Festival and some in commercial theatres. During the Second World War through these plays, and other works like The Wimsey Papers (1939–40) and Begin Here: A War-Time Essay (1940), Sayers "offered her countrymen a stirring argument for fighting", according to her biographer, Catherine Kenney. As early as 1929 Sayers had produced an adaptationfrom medieval Frenchof the poem Tristan by Thomas of Britain, and in 1946 she began to produce translations of Dante, firstly the four Pietra canzoni then, from 1948, the canticas of the Divine Comedy. Her critical analyses of Dante were popular and influential among scholars and the general public, although there has been some criticism that she overstressed the comedic side of his writing to make him more popular. Sayers died in December 1957 after suffering a sudden stroke.

Poems

Novels

Short story collections

Sayers contributed to numerous short story anthologies, but also published a number of collections of her own works.

Editor

Translation

Scripts and plays

Miscellany
Sayers wrote numerous essays, poems and stories which appeared in several publications, including Time and Tide, The Times Literary Supplement, Atlantic Monthly, Punch, The Spectator and the Westminster Gazette; in the last of these she was the author of a poem under the pseudonym H.P. Rallentando. She also wrote several book reviews for The Sunday Times.

Non fiction

Letters

Notes and references

Notes

References

Sources

 
 
 
  
 

Bibliographies by writer
Bibliographies of British writers